The Surprise Creek Falls, a segmented waterfall on the Surprise Creek, is located in the UNESCO World Heritagelisted Wet Tropics in the Far North region of Queensland, Australia.

Location and features
The Surprise Creek Falls are situated in the Barron Gorge National Park, north-east of Cairns and descend from the Atherton Tableland into the Baron Gorge below. The falls are located near Barron Gorge Hydro and cascade  into the gorge.

See also

 List of waterfalls of Queensland

References

External links

Waterfalls of Far North Queensland